J. T. Putney (October 5, 1928 - April 11, 2001) was a NASCAR Grand National Series race car driver who would accomplish 16 finishes in the "top five" in addition to 49 finishes in the "top ten." John B. Roberts  would become Putney's employer in 1965 & 1966, and  along with mechanic/engine builder Herman Beam they guided him to a seventh-place finish at the end of the 1965 NASCAR Grand National Cup Series.

Career
Putney's average start was 17th place while his average finish would end up being 15th place. Total earnings for this driver added up to $63,963 ($ when adjusted for inflation). One of his notable racing accomplishments outside of NASCAR was his seventh-place finish at the 1967 ARCA 250 Daytona Race in a 1966 Chevrolet machine. Putney mainly drove the #22 Chevrolet machine as a driver/owner in the NASCAR Cup Series.

When he was not racing on the track, Putney had a day job at American Enka Corp. as a corporate pilot. After his NASCAR career ended, he would fly for Kingsport Press (based out of Kingsport, Tennessee) in addition to other local aircraft companies. Putney would suffer from four other heart attacks before dying of his fifth in 2001. A brief stint as a businessman gave him the opportunity to briefly own a Budget Rental Car franchise. Putney would ultimately retire from any sort of business or flying after his first heart attack in 1979. When the air traffic controllers went on strike, he joined the FAA and took over their jobs from 1981 to 1990.

He would leave behind his wife Joyce, four kids (Debbie Putney Buckley, Dede Buckley Wasielewski, Taylor Putney, Lloyd Putney), three siblings (Nell Putney Casteen, W.W. Putney, Blake Putney), five biological grandchildren, and a surrogate grandchild named Tucker Smith.

References

External links
 

1928 births
2001 deaths
NASCAR drivers
People from Arden, North Carolina
Racing drivers from North Carolina
Air traffic controllers